Livesey is a civil parish in the ceremonial county of Lancashire, England.

Livesey may also refer to:

Livesey (surname)
7170 Livesey (1987 MK), a main-belt asteroid discovered on 30 June 1987
Livesey Museum for Children, Old Kent Road, Southwark, London, England
Charlie Livesey (1938–2005), English footballer
Dorothy Livesay Poetry Prize

See also
Livesay (disambiguation)